Thomas Francis Fremantle, 3rd Baron Cottesloe, 4th Baron Fremantle (5 February 1862 – 9 July 1956) was a British peer and sportsman who competed in the shooting event at the 1908 Summer Olympics.

Biography

Early life
Thomas Francis Fremantle was born on 5 February 1862. He was the son of Thomas Fremantle, 2nd Baron Cottesloe, and a direct descendant of Admiral Thomas Fremantle, who was awarded the Australian title of Baron Fremantle. Through his grandmother Louisa Elizabeth Nugent he was a  descendant of the Schuyler family and the Van Cortlandt family of British North America.

Career
Fremantle was Assistant Private Secretary to St John Brodrick when he was Secretary of State for War from 1900 until 1903.

Fremantle had a lifelong devotion to the armed forces, and as well as commanding the Territorial Army he was also an Honorary Colonel of the Buckinghamshire battalion of the Oxfordshire Light Infantry. He was an expert shot using the rifle and published three books on the subject. He was also on the War Office Small Arms Committee. He shot in the English Eight for 27 years and was its Captain from 1920 until his death. He competed in the 1000 yard free rifle event at the 1908 Summer Olympics.

In 1911, he was appointed a deputy lieutenant of Buckinghamshire.

On the death of his friend and fellow rifleman Sir Henry St. John Halford, 3rd Baronet of Wistow Hall, Leicestershire, in 1897, he inherited the Wistow estate and continued there the ballistic trials they had jointly carried out on the Wistow rifle range. His descendants still occupy the Hall.

Personal life
He resided in Swanbourne in Buckinghamshire. The house in which he lived is still the home of his descendants today. He died on 9 July 1956.

He married Frances (Anne) Tapling, daughter of the industrialist Thomas Tapling and sister of MP Thomas Tapling Jr., and was succeeded by his son John Fremantle, 4th Baron Cottesloe.

References

of the Austrian Empire

1862 births
1956 deaths
Barons in the Peerage of the United Kingdom
British people of Dutch descent
Oxfordshire and Buckinghamshire Light Infantry officers
Lord-Lieutenants of Buckinghamshire
People from Aylesbury Vale
Deputy Lieutenants of Buckinghamshire
British male sport shooters
Olympic shooters of Great Britain
Shooters at the 1908 Summer Olympics
Schuyler family
Van Cortlandt family
Eldest sons of British hereditary barons
Barons of Austria